Rocco Romano (born January 23, 1963) is a former Canadian football player. He played 14 seasons in the Canadian Football League, ten of those with the Calgary Stampeders, and was a five-time All-Star as an offensive lineman. While in Calgary, he won two Grey Cups, in 1992 and 1998.

Born in Hamilton, Ontario, Romano was the winner of the CFL's DeMarco-Becket Memorial Trophy in 1994 and 1996 for the Stampeders, which is awarded to the player selected as the outstanding lineman in the West Division. He was inducted into the Canadian Football Hall of Fame in 2007.

He is an alumnus of St. Ann's Catholic elementary, Cathedral High School and Concordia University in Montreal. He married Shauna Sky and they raised two children together before getting divorced.

References

1963 births
Living people
BC Lions players
Calgary Stampeders players
Canadian Football Hall of Fame inductees
Canadian Football League announcers
Canadian football offensive linemen
Canadian people of Italian descent
Concordia Stingers football players
Ottawa Rough Riders players
Sportspeople from Hamilton, Ontario
Players of Canadian football from Ontario
Toronto Argonauts players